Andre Begemann and Matthew Ebden were the defending champions but decided not to participate.
Daniel Muñoz-de la Nava and Rubén Ramírez Hidalgo won the title, defeating Mate Pavić and Franko Škugor 6–2, 7–6(10) in the final.

Seeds

Draw

Draw

External Links
 Main Draw

Zagreb Open - Doubles
Zagreb Open